Edward Raymond Wheeler (May 24, 1915 – August 4, 1983) was a Major League Baseball infielder who played for one season. He played in 46 games for the Cleveland Indians during the 1945 Cleveland Indians season, splitting time as a third baseman and shortstop. He was born in Los Angeles and he died in Centralia, Washington.

External links

1915 births
1983 deaths
Major League Baseball infielders
Cleveland Indians players
Baseball players from Los Angeles